Horizon Christian School is a private Christian school located in Hood River, Oregon, United States.

The school was founded in 1976 and has been accredited by the Association of Christian Schools International since 1978, and by the Northwest Association of Accredited Schools since 1999. In 2018 it was named by Niche as one of the top twenty private schools in Oregon.

In 2020, Horizon Christian School, along with Life Christian School and McMinnville Christian Academy, sued Oregon Governor Kate Brown over COVID restrictions, claiming that "Brown violated the First Amendment by saying public universities can remain open for in-person classes if they comply with safety measures, while houses of worship and faith-based gatherings are still limited." U.S. District Court Judge Michael W. Mosman denied a preliminary injunction demanded by the schools.

The Horizon Hawks compete in the Oregon School Activities Association Big Sky League (1A-6). They are not to be confused with Horizon Christian School in Tualatin, Oregon, whose teams are also known as the Hawks but compete in the Lewis & Clark League (3A-1).

References

External links
 

Christian schools in Oregon
Private elementary schools in Oregon
Private middle schools in Oregon
Private high schools in Oregon
Educational institutions established in 1976
Buildings and structures in Hood River, Oregon
Schools in Hood River County, Oregon
1976 establishments in Oregon